Ruppel is a German language surname. It stems from a reduced form of the male given name Ruprecht – and may refer to:
Annina Ruppel (1980), German rowing coxswain
Berthold Ruppel (died in 1494), first printer in Basel, Switzerland
Ellen Ruppel Shell (1952), American journalist
Martin Ruppel (1966), German rowing coxswain
Richard Ruppel, American literary critic
Robh Ruppel (1960), American artist

References 

German-language surnames
Surnames from given names